Shooting at the 2012 Summer Paralympics consisted of twelve events. The competition was held in the Royal Artillery Barracks in Woolwich from 30 August to 6 September.

Classification
Paralympic shooters were classified according to the extent of their disability. The classification system allowed shooters to compete against others with a similar level of function.

Shooting classifications are:
SH1 - competitors who do not need a shooting stand
SH2 - competitors who use a shooting stand to support the firearm's weight

Events
For each of the events below, medals were contested for one or both of the above classifications. After each classification was given the date that the event was contested.

Men's 10 m air pistol
 SH1 - 30 August
Men's 10 m air rifle standing
 SH1 - 31 August
Men's 50 m rifle 3 positions
 SH1 - 5 September
Women's 10 m air pistol
 SH1 - 31 August
Women's 10 m air rifle standing
 SH1 - 30 August
Women's 50 m rifle 3 positions
 SH1 - 6 September
Mixed 25 m pistol
 SH1 - 3 September
Mixed 50 m pistol
 SH1 - 6 September
Mixed 10 m air rifle prone
 SH1 - 1 September
 SH2 - 1 September
Mixed 10 m air rifle standing
 SH2 - 2 September
Mixed 50 m rifle prone
 SH1 - 4 September

Participating nations
There were 140 athletes (99 male, 41 female) taking part in this sport.

Medal summary

Medal table
This ranking sorts countries by the number of gold medals earned by their shooters (in this context a nation is an entity represented by a National Paralympic Committee). The number of silver medals is taken into consideration next and then the number of bronze medals. If, after the above, countries are still tied, equal ranking is given and they are listed alphabetically.

Medalists

References

External links
Official Site of the 2012 Summer Paralympics

 
2012
2012 Summer Paralympics events
Paralympics
Shooting competitions in the United Kingdom